The Tempe Wick Road–Washington Corners Historic District is a  historic district located in Harding Township and Mendham Township in Morris County, New Jersey. It extends along Tempe Wick Road from Mount Kemble Avenue (U.S. Route 202) to Cold Hill Road, and short segments of Corey Lane, Cemetery Road, Kennaday Road, Leddell Road, and Jockey Hollow Road. Tempe Wick Road is named for Temperance Wick. The district was added to the National Register of Historic Places on August 25, 2000, for its significance in architecture and military history. The district includes 44 contributing buildings, 6 contributing sites, 10 contributing structures, and 4 contributing objects.

History and description
The Peter Kemble House, previously listed on the NRHP individually, is included in the district. The Henry S. Hoyt House, also known as Glen Alpin, was built  with Gothic Revival style.

Gallery

See also
Jockey Hollow
New Jersey Brigade Encampment Site
National Register of Historic Places listings in Morris County, New Jersey

References

External links
 
 

Harding Township, New Jersey
Mendham Township, New Jersey
National Register of Historic Places in Morris County, New Jersey
Historic districts in Morris County, New Jersey
Historic districts on the National Register of Historic Places in New Jersey
New Jersey Register of Historic Places